Jeff Jackson may refer to:

Jeff Jackson (athlete) (born 1974), hurdler from the United States Virgin Islands
Jeff Jackson (basketball) (born 1961), basketball coach
Jeff Jackson (ice hockey, born 1955), ice hockey coach
Jeff Jackson (ice hockey, born 1965), ice hockey player and executive
Jeff Jackson (baseball) (born 1972), baseball player
Jeff Jackson (politician) (born 1982), American politician; U.S. Representative from North Carolina

See also
Geoffrey Jackson (1915–1987), British diplomat and writer
Geoffrey Jackson (cricketer) (1894–1917), English cricketer
Geoffrey W. Jackson (born 1955), member of the Governing Body of Jehovah's Witnesses
Jackson (name)